Henri Barbusse (17 May 1873 – 30 August 1935) was a French novelist and a member of the French Communist Party. He was a lifelong friend of Albert Einstein.

Life
The son of a French father and an English mother, Barbusse was born in Asnières-sur-Seine, France in 1873.  Although he grew up in a small town, he left for Paris in 1889, at age 16. In 1914, at age 41, he enlisted in the French Army and served on the western front during World War I. Invalided out of the army three times, Barbusse would serve in the war for 17 months, until November 1915, when he was permanently moved into a clerical position due to pulmonary damage, exhaustion, and dysentery. On 8 June 1915, he is awarded the Croix de guerre with citation. He was reformed on 1 June 1917.

Barbusse first came to fame with the publication of his novel Le Feu (translated by William Fitzwater Wray as Under Fire) in 1916, which was based on his experiences during World War I. By this time, Barbusse had become a pacifist, and his writing demonstrated his growing hatred of militarism. Le Feu drew criticism at the time for its harsh naturalism, but won the Prix Goncourt in December 1916.

In January 1918, he left France and moved to Moscow, where he married a Russian woman and joined the Bolshevik Party. His novel, Clarté, is about an office worker who, while serving in the army, begins to realize that the imperialist war is a crime.. Vladimir Lenin commented that this novel was censored in France.

The Russian Revolution had significant influence on Barbusse's life and work. He joined the French Communist Party in 1923 and later traveled back to the Soviet Union. His later works, Manifeste aux Intellectuels (Elevations) (1930) and others, show a more revolutionary standpoint. Of these, the 1921 Le Couteau entre les dents (The Knife Between My Teeth) marks Barbusse's siding with Bolshevism and the October Revolution. Barbusse characterized the birth of Soviet Russia as "the greatest and most beautiful phenomenon in world history". The book Light from the Abyss (1919) and the collection of articles Words of a Fighting Man (1920) contain calls for the overthrow of capitalism. In 1925, Barbusse published Chains, showing history as the unbroken chain of suffering of people and their struggle for freedom and justice. In the publicistic book The Butchers, he exposes the White Terror in the Balkan countries. In his 1928 book Voici ce qu'on a fait de la Géorgie, Barbusse praised post-sovietization political, social, and economic conditions in Georgia, triggering a critical response from the Georgian émigré Dathico Charachidze who published in 1929 Barbusse, les Soviets et la Géorgie, with a sympathetic preface by Karl Kautsky.

In 1927, Barbusse participated in the Congress of Friends of the Soviet Union in Moscow. He led the World Congress Against Imperialist War (Amsterdam, 1932) and headed the World Committee Against War and Fascism, founded in 1933. He also took part in the work of the International Youth Congress (Paris, 1933) and the International Congress of Writers in Defense of Culture. Additionally, in the 1920s and 1930s, he edited the periodicals Monde (1928–1935) and Progrès Civique, which published some of George Orwell's first writings. He was also literary editor for the daily newspaper l'Humanité from 1926 to 1929.

In 1934, Barbusse sent Egon Kisch to Australia to represent the International Movement Against War and Fascism as part of his work for the Comintern. The resulting unsuccessful exclusion of Egon Kisch from Australia by the Conservative Australian Government succeeded in energizing Communism in Australia and resulted in Kisch's staying longer than Barbusse had intended.

An associate of Romain Rolland's and editor of Clarté, he attempted to define a "proletarian literature", akin to Proletkult and Socialist realism. Barbusse was the author of a 1936 biography of Joseph Stalin, titled Staline: Un monde nouveau vu à travers un homme (Stalin. A New World Seen Through the Man).

Barbusse was an Esperantist, and was honorary president of the first congress of the Sennacieca Asocio Tutmonda. In 1921, he wrote an article titled "Esperantista Laboristo" ("Esperantist worker") for Esperanto journal.

Death
While writing a second biography of Stalin in Moscow, Barbusse fell ill with pneumonia and died on 30 August 1935. His funeral drew 500,000 people and he is buried at the Père Lachaise Cemetery in Paris.

Legacy
In the Spanish Civil War in December 1936 the Henri Barbusse Battalion was formed as part of the XIV International Brigade, named in honour of Henri Barbusse.

In the foreword to I Saw It Happen, a 1942 collection of eyewitness accounts of the war, Lewis Gannett wrote: "We shall be hearing and reading of this war for decades to come. No one of us can yet guess who will be its Tolstoys, its Barbusses, its Remarques and its Hemingways".

The parc Henri Barbusse was the site of the Château d'Issy.

Works
1895 – Pleureuses; English translation: The Hired Mourners (poetry)
1903 – Les Suppliants; English translation: The Supplicants (prose novel)
1908 – L'enfer; English translation: Hell (novel)
1912 – Meissonier; (biography)
1916 – Le feu; English translation: Under Fire (novel)
1921 – Le couteau entre les dents; English translation: The Knife Between My Teeth (novel)
1921 – Quelque Coins du Coeur (prose pieces with 24 woodcuts by Frans Masereel)
1923 – Esperantista Laboristo; English translation: "Esperantist Worker" (magazine article)
1930 – Manifeste aux intellectuels; English translation: Elevations (novel)
1936 – Staline: Un monde nouveau vu à travers un homme (biography); English translation:

References

External links

 
 
 
 

1873 births
1935 deaths
People from Asnières-sur-Seine
Bolsheviks
French Communist Party members
French anti-fascists
French biographers
French Esperantists
French journalists
19th-century French novelists
20th-century French novelists
20th-century French male writers
Marxist journalists
Proletarian literature
Writers from Île-de-France
French military personnel of World War I
Prix Goncourt winners
Honorary Members of the USSR Academy of Sciences
Burials at Père Lachaise Cemetery
French male novelists
Deaths from pneumonia in the Soviet Union
Recipients of the Croix de Guerre 1914–1918 (France)
Male biographers